Samaia may refer to:
Samaia, a kind of Georgian dance
Arai–Samaia languages of New Guinea
Guilherme Samaia (born 1996), Brazilian racing driver
Bara Char Samaia, a village in Bangladesh

See also
Samaya (disambiguation)